Oecanthus pini, the pine tree cricket, is a species of tree cricket in the family Gryllidae. It is found in North America.

References

pini
Articles created by Qbugbot
Insects described in 1894
Orthoptera of North America